Abigail Conceição de Souza (October 12, 1921 in Porto Alegre, Rio Grande do Sul – December 27, 2007 in Porto Alegre, Rio Grande do Sul) was a Brazilian football (soccer) player.

He began playing football at the age of twelve. Abigail was a full back and began his career with Força e Luz football Club of Porto Alegre club that are obsolete today. In February 1942, at the age of twenty years, he was signed by Inter where he was part of the legendary "Scroll Compressor" Colorado (considered by some critics as the greatest team that existed in Rio Grande do Sul).

In the famous campaign of the Inter hexacampeonato gaucho, Abigail won four of the six titles. In addition, he served in Grenal 1948, where the famous classic Inter applied a 7-0 rout over the tricolor gaucho.

Clubs
 Força e Luz (RS): 1942
 Internacional (RS): 1942 - 1950
 Nacional (RS): 1950 - 1954

Honours
 Campeonato Gaúcho: six times (1942, 1943, 1944, 1945, 1947 and 1948).

Report
 Site oficial do Sport Club Internacional - Abigail, Zagueiro do Rolo Compressor, Visita O Beira-Rio - 10/09/2006(pt)

1921 births
2007 deaths
Footballers from Porto Alegre
Brazilian footballers
Sport Club Internacional players
Association football fullbacks